Xin'an Subdistrict  is a subdistrict of the Bao'an District, Shenzhen, Guangdong, China.

Demographics
The total population in the subdistrict is 660,000 people, with a registered population of 160,000.

Government
There are 22 residential communities.

Economy
There are as many as 8,000 commercial venues, and 1,000 manufacturing enterprises.

See also
List of township-level divisions of Guangdong

References

Bao'an District
Subdistricts of Shenzhen